Eight ships of the French Navy have borne the name Le Triomphant,  Triomphant or Triomphante ("triumphant"):

 , a ship of the line launched as Princesse ("Princess"), renamed Triomphant in 1671, and Constant ("reliable one") in 1678.
 , a ship of the line launched as Constant and renamed in 1678
 , a ship of the line
 , a ship of the line
 , a ship of the line
 , a  launched in 1877 and sold in 1903

See also 
 
 
 
 , privateer

Bibliography 
 
 

French Navy ship names